Planica 1941 was a ski flying study week, allowed only in study purposes, with main competition held on 2 March 1941 in Planica, Drava Banovina, Kingdom of Yugoslavia. Around 15,000 people gathered for the competition, which was used as a propaganda tool by the Nazi regime. Two world records were set, including a  jump which stood until 1948.

Schedule

Background
An enormous ski jump was built in 1933 in Planica in the Kingdom of Yugoslavia, at which a dozen world records were set in the mid-1930s. While occupying Yugoslavia during World War II, the Nazi regime enlarged the course to make it possible to set new records for propaganda purposes. A competition was held in 1941, which notably excluded the top Norwegian skiers.

All jumps over 105 metres 
Chronological order:
106 metres (348 ft) – 28 February – Paul Krauß (4RD, Training 3)
106 metres (348 ft) – 28 February – Rudi Gering (4RD, Training 3)
108 metres (354 ft) – 2 March – Rudi Gering (WR, 2RD, Competition)
105 metres (344 ft) – 2 March – Paul Krauß (fall, 2Rd, Competition)
109 metres (358 ft) – 2 March – Heinz Palme (WR fall, 3RD, Competition)
118 metres (387 ft) – 2 March – Rudi Gering (WR, 3RD, Competition)
111 metres (364 ft) – 2 March – Hans Lahr (3RD, Competition)
112 metres (367 ft) – 2 March – Paul Krauß (3RD, Competition)
109 metres (358 ft) – 2 March – Franz Mair (fall, 3RD, Competition)

Competition
On 26 February 1941, the first official training day was held.

On 28 February 1941, at the third official training, there were a total of 18 jumps which exceeded one hundred metres.

There were no jumps on 1 March, during which the hill was repaired and prepared for the next day's competition.

On 2 March, a large crowd had arrived for the competition. The International Ski Federation (FIS) was very reserved toward ski flying and the dangers involved in establishing world records, and endorsed the competition for study purposes only. People have seen total of 49 jumps and two world records.

Competition was scheduled in two parts: morning interns and an afternoon round for records hunting. The run experienced melting from strong sunlight and only 17 competitors were able to complete morning runs (8 Germans and 9 Yugoslavians).

By 2 pm conditions had changed, the inrun froze and the course speed increased. The fourth and final round had a series of great jumps: Heinz Palme reached  but a ground touch invalidated this for a world record distance. Other jumps were Hans Lahr (111 m), Paul Krauß (112 m) and Franz Mair (109 m with fall).

First official training
26 February 1941 – chronological order not available

Second official training
27 February 1941 – chronological order not available

Third official training
13:00 pm – 28 February 1941 – chronological order

Ski Flying Study competition
11:45 am – 2 March 1941 – One round – chronological order

 Not recognized. Crash at WR! Yugoslavian national record! World record! Fall or touch!

Official results
2 March 1941 – 2:00 pm – best jump

Ski flying world records

 Not recognized! Touch ground at world record distance.

References

1941 in Yugoslav sport
1941 in ski jumping
1941 in Slovenia
Ski jumping competitions in Yugoslavia
International sports competitions hosted by Yugoslavia
Ski jumping competitions in Slovenia
International sports competitions hosted by Slovenia